Lullin is a commune in the Haute-Savoie department in the Auvergne-Rhône-Alpes region in south-eastern France. It borders the communes of Vailly, Orcier, Habère-Poche and Bellevaux. The river Follaz goes through the town before flowing into the river Brevon, which in turn flows into the river Dranse, which eventually flows into Lake Geneva.
The commune of Lullin includes several hamlets such as Pimberty, La Siaux, la Touvière, La Grange des Bois, Le Feu, Très-le-Mont, Chez Dagain, Vauverdanne, Monterrebout, Les Courbes, Les Granges, Recueillères. Its highest point is Mont Forchat (1545m).

See also
Communes of the Haute-Savoie department

References

Communes of Haute-Savoie